March 22 - Eastern Orthodox liturgical calendar - March 24

All fixed commemorations below are observed on April 5 by Orthodox Churches on the Old Calendar.

For March 23rd, Orthodox Churches on the Old Calendar commemorate the Saints listed on March 10.

Saints

 Martyrs Philetas the Senator, his wife Lydia, their sons Macedon and Theoprepius, the notary Cronides, and Amphilochius the Captain, in Illyria (125) (see also: March 27)
 Monk-martyr Nikon and 199 disciples, in Sicily (251)
 Martyr Dometius in Phrygia (360-361)  (see also: October 30)

Pre-Schism Western saints

 Saint Victorian, Frumentius and Companions (484)
 Saint Gwinear of Cornwall (5th century)
 Saint Felix and Companions, a group of twenty-one martyrs in North Africa (5th century)
 Saint Fidelis, a martyr in North Africa.
 Saint Maidoc (Mo-Mhaedog), Abbot of Fiddown in Kilkenny in Ireland (5th century)
 Saint Benedict of Campania (Benedict the Hermit), hermit in the Campagna in Italy, miraculously delivered from death by burning at the hands of Totila the Goth (550)
 Saint Æthelwold, a monk at Ripon in England, he lived as a hermit on Inner Farne for twelve years (699)
 Saint Felix of Montecassino (ca. 1000)

Post-Schism Orthodox saints

 Venerable Nicon, abbot of the Kiev Caves (1088)
 Venerable Ephraim of the Kiev Caves (13th century)
 Venerable Pachomius, Abbot of Nerekhta (1384)
 Saint Bassian, Archbishop of Rostov (1481)
 Venerable Theodosius the Wonderworker, Abbot of the Monastery of the Saviour in Totma, Russia (1568) (see also: January 28)
 Righteous Basil of Mangazea in Siberia (1602) (see also: March 22; and June 6, May 10 - Translation of Relics)
 New Monk-martyr Luke the New of Adrianople and Mt. Athos, at Mytilene (1802)
 New Martyr Panagiotis at Jerusalem (1820) (see also: April 5)
 Saint Elena (Bakhteiv), Nun of the Florovsk Ascension Convent in Kiev (1834)

New martyrs and confessors

 New Hieromartyr Macarius Kvitkin, Protopresbyter of Orenburg (1931)
 New Hieromartyr Elijah (Vyatlin), hieromonk of the Lukianov Monastery of the Nativity of the Theotokos, Vladimir (1938)
 New Hieromartyrs Basil Koklyn, and Stephen Preobrazhensky, Priests (1938)
 New Martyr James (1938)
 Virgin-martyr Anastasia Bobkova (1938)
 Martyr Alexis Skorobogatov (1938)
 New Hiero-Confessor Venerable Sergius (Srebriansky), Archimandrite, of Tver (1948)

Other commemorations

 Repose of Elder Porphyrius of Glinsk Hermitage (1868)

Icon gallery

Notes

References

Sources
 March 23/April 5. Orthodox Calendar (PRAVOSLAVIE.RU).
 April 5 / March 23. HOLY TRINITY RUSSIAN ORTHODOX CHURCH (A parish of the Patriarchate of Moscow).
 March 23. OCA - The Lives of the Saints.
 The Autonomous Orthodox Metropolia of Western Europe and the Americas (ROCOR). St. Hilarion Calendar of Saints for the year of our Lord 2004. St. Hilarion Press (Austin, TX). p. 23.
 March 23. Latin Saints of the Orthodox Patriarchate of Rome.
 The Roman Martyrology. Transl. by the Archbishop of Baltimore. Last Edition, According to the Copy Printed at Rome in 1914. Revised Edition, with the Imprimatur of His Eminence Cardinal Gibbons. Baltimore: John Murphy Company, 1916. pp. 84–85.
 Rev. Richard Stanton. A Menology of England and Wales, or, Brief Memorials of the Ancient British and English Saints Arranged According to the Calendar, Together with the Martyrs of the 16th and 17th Centuries. London: Burns & Oates, 1892. pp. 130–131.
Greek Sources
 Great Synaxaristes:  23 ΜΑΡΤΙΟΥ. ΜΕΓΑΣ ΣΥΝΑΞΑΡΙΣΤΗΣ.
  Συναξαριστής. 23 Μαρτίου. ECCLESIA.GR. (H ΕΚΚΛΗΣΙΑ ΤΗΣ ΕΛΛΑΔΟΣ). 
Russian Sources
  5 апреля (23 марта). Православная Энциклопедия под редакцией Патриарха Московского и всея Руси Кирилла (электронная версия). (Orthodox Encyclopedia - Pravenc.ru).
  23 марта (ст.ст.) 5 апреля 2013 (нов. ст.). Русская Православная Церковь Отдел внешних церковных связей. (DECR).

March in the Eastern Orthodox calendar